Sino-Third World relations refers to the general relationship between the two Chinese states across the Taiwan Strait (the People's Republic of China and the Republic of China) and the rest of the Third World, and its history from the Chinese perspective.

Next in importance to its relations with the superpowers—the Soviet Union and United States—during the Cold War were China's relations with the rest of the Third World. Chinese leaders have tended to view the developing nations of Asia, Africa, and Latin America as a major force in international affairs, and they have considered China an integral part of this major Third World force. As has been the case with China's foreign relations in general, policy toward the countries of the developing world has fluctuated over time. It has been affected by China's alternating involvement in and isolation from world affairs and by the militancy or peacefulness of Beijing's views. In addition, China's relations with the Third World have been affected by China's ambiguous position as a developing country that nevertheless has certain attributes more befitting a major power. China has been variously viewed by the Third World as a friend and ally, a competitor for markets and loans, a source of economic assistance, a regional power intent on dominating Asia, and a "candidate superpower" with such privileges as a permanent seat on the UN Security Council.

History
China's relations with the Third World have developed through several phases: the Bandung Line of the mid-1950s (named for a 1955 conference of Asian and African nations held in Bandung, Indonesia), support for liberation and world revolution in the 1960s, the pronouncement of the Theory of the Three Worlds and support for a "new international economic order" in the 1970s, and a renewed emphasis on the Five Principles of Peaceful Coexistence in the 1980s. Chinese government provides consistent political support to the Group of 77 and has made financial contributions to the Group since 1994. As a result, official statements of the G77 are delivered in the name of The Group of 77 and China. In addition, the foundation for China's 21st century engagement with Africa as the largest bloc of the Third World is the October 2000 Beijing ministerial conference for China-Africa dialogue (FOCAC) that set the basis for China's aspirations for a new world order, with elevated voice of the Third World.

Early years of the People's Republic
In the first years after the founding of the People's Republic, Chinese statements echoed the Soviet view that the world was divided into two camps, the forces of socialism and those of imperialism, with "no third road" possible. By 1953 China began reasserting its belief that the newly independent developing countries could play an important intermediary role in world affairs. In 1954 Zhou Enlai and Prime Minister Jawaharlal Nehru of India agreed on the Five Principles of Peaceful Coexistence as the underlying basis for conducting foreign relations. China's success in promoting these principles at the 1955 Bandung Conference helped China emerge from diplomatic isolation. By the end of the 1950s, however, China's foreign policy stance had become more militant. Statements promoting the Chinese revolution as a model and Beijing's actions in the Taiwan Strait (1958) (see Second Taiwan Strait Crisis) and in border conflicts with India  (1962) (see Sino-Indian War) and Vietnam (1979) (see Sino-Vietnamese War), for example, alarmed many Third World nations.

1960s
During the 1960s China cultivated ties with Third World countries and insurgent groups in an attempt to encourage "wars of national liberation" and revolution and to forge an international united front against both superpowers. China offered economic and technical assistance to other countries and liberation movements, which, although small in comparison with Soviet and United States aid, was significant considering China's own needs. Third World appreciation for Chinese assistance coexisted, however, with growing suspicions of China's militancy. Such suspicions were fed, for example, by Zhou Enlai's statement in the early 1960s that the potential for revolution in Africa was "excellent" and by the publication of Lin Biao's essay "Long Live the Victory of People's War!" in 1965. Discord between China and many Third World countries continued to grow. In some cases, as with Indonesia's charge of Chinese complicity in the 1965 coup attempt in Jakarta and claims by several African nations of Chinese subversion during the Cultural Revolution, bilateral disputes led to the breaking off of diplomatic relations. Although the Third World was not a primary focus of the Cultural Revolution, it was not immune to the chaos this period wrought upon Chinese foreign relations.

1970s
In the 1970s, China began to redefine its foreign policy after the isolation and militancy of the late 1960s. China reestablished those of its diplomatic missions that had been recalled during the Cultural Revolution and began the process of rapprochement with the United States. In 1971, the support of Third World nations was crucial in the PRC joining the United Nations (UN), taking over the seat of the ROC on Taiwan. China preferenced for a United Nations Secretary-General from the Third World. China's major foreign policy statement during this time was Mao's Theory of the Three Worlds, which was presented publicly by Deng Xiaoping at the UN in 1974. According to this theory, the First World consisted of the two superpowers—the Soviet Union and the United States—both "imperialist aggressors" whose rivalry was the greatest cause of impending world war. The Third World was the main force in international affairs. Its growing opposition to superpower hegemony was exemplified by such world events as the Arab nations' control of oil prices, Egypt's expulsion of Soviet aid personnel in 1972, and the United States withdrawal from Vietnam. The Second World, comprising the developed countries of Europe plus Japan, could either oppress the Third World or join in opposing the superpowers. By the second half of the 1970s, China perceived an increased threat from the Soviet Union, and the theory was modified to emphasize that the Soviet Union was the more dangerous of the two superpowers.

The other primary component of China's Third World policy in the early 1970s was a call for radical change in the world power structure and particularly a call for a "new international economic order." Until the late 1970s, the Chinese principles of sovereignty, opposition to hegemony, and self-reliance coincided with the goals of the movement for a new international economic order. Chinese statements in support of the new order diminished as China began to implement the opening up policy, allow foreign investment, and seek technical assistance and foreign loans. China's critical opinion of international financial institutions appeared to change abruptly as Beijing prepared to join the International Monetary Fund and the World Bank in 1980. Chinese support for changes in the economic order stressed the role of collective self-reliance among the countries of the Third World, or "South-South Cooperation," in the 1980s.

1980s
Also in the 1980s, China reasserted its Third World credentials and placed a renewed emphasis on its relations with Third World countries as part of its independent foreign policy. China stressed that it would develop friendly relations with other nations regardless of their social systems or ideologies and would conduct its relations on the basis of the Five Principles of Peaceful Coexistence. Beijing exchanged delegations with Third World countries regularly, and it made diplomatic use of cultural ties, for example, by promoting friendly links between Chinese Muslims and Islamic countries. Officially, China denied that it sought a leadership role in the Third World, although some foreign observers argued to the contrary. Beijing increasingly based its foreign economic relations with the Third World on equality and mutual benefit, expressed by a shift toward trade and joint ventures and away from grants and interest-free loans.

By the second half of the 1980s, China's relations with Third World nations covered the spectrum from friendly to inimical. Bilateral relations ranged from a formal alliance with North Korea, to a near-alliance with Pakistan, to hostile relations with Vietnam marked by sporadic border conflict. Many relationships have changed dramatically over time: for example, China previously had close relations with Vietnam; its ties with India were friendly during the 1950s but were strained thereafter by border tensions and Pakistan hoped that China would serve as a counterweight to Indian influence. Particularly in Southeast Asia, a legacy of suspicion concerning China's ultimate intentions affected Chinese relations with many countries.

Present

Some of these, including six in the Pacific, one in Africa had formal ties with Taipei instead (see Political status of Taiwan). China's growing interest in trade and technical exchanges, however, meant that in some cases substantial unofficial relations existed despite the absence of diplomatic recognition.

The formation of BRICS alliance or BASIC countries, along with the Asian Infrastructure Investment Bank and Belt and Road Initiative was attempt by China to offer an alternative financial and economic services to third world countries.

List of third world conflicts involving the People's Republic of China & the Republic of China

One primary motivation for involvement in third world conflicts for PRC and ROC was to gain influence and legitimacy, claiming to be the only 'China' while undermining other side. This was part wider pattern in the Cold War where the world was divided into spheres of influence.  Later the Sino-Soviet Split occurred, with the PRC completing against the Soviet Union for influence.

See also
Communist front
International Conference of Marxist–Leninist Parties and Organizations (International Newsletter)

References

External links
The Ministry of Foreign Affairs for the People's Republic of China - Official website
Nigel Harris Maoist China foreign policy: 1970s and 1980s (Excerpt from The Mandate of Heaven)

Third World
Third World
Third-Worldism